During the 1999–2000 English football season, Wimbledon competed in the Premier League (known as the FA Carling Premiership for sponsorship reasons).

The season began with a new manager, Norway's Egil Olsen, after the close season resignation of long-serving Joe Kinnear, but Olsen was ousted with two weeks of the season remaining and replaced by coach Terry Burton, who was unable to save Wimbledon from relegation after 14 successive seasons of top division football.

Season summary
Wimbledon's new season began with a 3–2 win against newly promoted Watford at Vicarage Road; this would turn out to be the Dons' only ever away league win throughout the season. The close-season resignation of former Joe Kinnear because of health problems (he would suffer from them again as manager of Newcastle United) after seven years as manager led to the appointment of former Norwegian national coach Egil Olsen as Wimbledon's new manager, giving Dons fans hope of beating the drop once again. The mid-season collapse of star striker John Hartson's move to Tottenham Hotspur was further good news to the cause, but a run of eight straight defeats during the final weeks of the season dragged Wimbledon into the depth of the relegation mire. Olsen was sacked after a 3–0 defeat away to Bradford City, to be replaced by former coach and assistant manager Terry Burton for the final two games of the season. A 2–2 draw at home to Aston Villa gave them hope going into their last game, away to Southampton. They were one place above the relegation zone on goal difference, but a 2–0 defeat at the Dell – combined with Bradford's 1–0 win over Liverpool – condemned Wimbledon to relegation and ended their 14-year stay in the top flight. The transition coincided with the end of one of the most remarkable rags-to-riches stories in football, which had started with Wimbledon's election to the Football League in 1977 and seen them reach the top flight nine years later, before peaking as 1988 FA Cup Final winners. Their relegation was confirmed 12 years to the day that Wimbledon achieved their famous victory over Liverpool at Wembley.

Final league table

Results summary

Results by round

Results
Wimbledon's score comes first

Legend

FA Premier League

FA Cup

League Cup

Players

First-team squad
Squad at end of season

Left club during season

Reserve squad
The following players did not make an appearance for the first team this season.

Transfers

In
  Tore Pedersen –  Eintracht Frankfurt, 6 July 1999, free
  Walid Badir –  Hapoel Petah Tikva, 1 July 1999, £1,000,000
  Martin Andresen –  Stabæk Fotball, 4 October 1999, £1,800,000
  Chris Willmott –  Luton Town, 9 July 1999, £650,000
  Kelvin Davis –  Luton Town, 12 July 1999, £650,000
  Trond Andersen –  Molde, 10 August 1999, £2,500,000
  Hermann Hreiðarsson –  Brentford,  12 October 1999, £2,500,000
  Kjetil Wæhler –  Lyn, 29 October 1999, free
  Andreas Lund –  Molde, 11 February 2000, £2,800,000

Out
  Andy Clarke –  Peterborough United, 1 June 1999, free
  Chris Perry –  Tottenham Hotspur, 3 July 1999, £4,000,000
  Mark Kennedy –  Manchester City, 8 July 1999, £1,000,000
  Andy Futcher -  Doncaster Rovers, 1 September 1999, free
  Peter Fear –  Oxford United, 13 July 1999, free
  Andy Pearce –  Aldershot Town, 22 October 1999, free
  Efan Ekoku –  Grasshoppers, 26 August 1999, £500,000
  Jon Goodman – retired, 26 January 2000
  Ceri Hughes –  Portsmouth, 21 January 2000, £150,000

Loaned out
  Patrick Agyemang –  Brentford, 4 months

Statistics

Starting 11
Only considering Premiership starts
Considering a 4–3–3 formation
 GK: #1,  Neil Sullivan, 37
 RB: #6,  Ben Thatcher, 19
 CB: #2,  Kenny Cunningham, 37
 CB: #30,  Hermann Hreiðarsson, 24
 LB: #3,  Alan Kimble, 24
 RCM: #8,  Robbie Earle, 23
 CM: #29,  Trond Andersen, 35
 LCM: #10,  Jason Euell, 32
 RW: #7,  Carl Cort, 32
 CF: #11,  Marcus Gayle, 35
 LW: #9,  John Hartson, 15 (#5,  Dean Blackwell, made 16 starts as a central defender)

Appearances and goals
Source:
Numbers in parentheses denote appearances as substitute.
Players with names struck through and marked  left the club during the playing season.
Players with names in italics and marked * were on loan from another club for the whole of their season with Burnley.
Players listed with no appearances have been in the matchday squad but only as unused substitutes.
Key to positions: GK – Goalkeeper; DF – Defender; MF – Midfielder; FW – Forward

References

Notes

Wimbledon F.C. seasons
Wimbledon